Events in 2009 in animation.



Events

January
 January 15: Adam Eliot's Mary and Max premiers.
 January 16: Pleasant Goat and Big Big Wolf: The Super Snail Adventure is released, the first film based on the Pleasant Goat and Big Big Wolf TV series.
 January 18: The first episode of Masha and the Bear is broadcast.
 January 30: During the Gérardmer Film Festival Tomm Moore's The Secret of Kells premiers.

February
 February 5: Henry Selick's Coraline, based on Neil Gaiman's eponymous novel, is first released.
 February 6: Futurama: Into the Wild Green Yonder, based on the TV series Futurama, premieres at the New York Comic Con; it would later be generally released on August 30. 
 February 12: Sergey Seryogin's Alice's Birthday is released.
 February 13: Toon Disney and Jetix relaunched as Disney XD.
 February 22: 81st Academy Awards: 
 WALL-E wins the Academy Award for Best Animated Feature.
 La Maison en Petits Cubes by Kunio Kato wins the Academy Award for Best Animated Short.
 February 23: Eddie White's The Cat Piano premiers, which features narration by Nick Cave.

March
 March 3: Lauren Montgomery's Wonder Woman is released direct-to-DVD to positive reviews.
 March 5: Jiří Barta's Toys in the Attic is released. 
 March 17: The Simpsons episode "In the Name of the Grandfather" is first broadcast, in which the family travels to Ireland.
 March 24: Conrad Vernon and Rob Letterman's Monsters vs. Aliens premiers.

April
 April 1: The first episode of The Amazing Spiez! is broadcast, though it had aired on March 15 on Disney Channel (Asia) before.
 April 20: The first episode of Fishtronaut is broadcast.

May
 May 13–24: Up and A Town Called Panic premiere at the 2009 Cannes Film Festival.
 May 17: The Simpsons episode "Four Great Women and a Manicure" premieres, guest starring Jodie Foster.
 May 31: After more than 10 years on the air, Jay Jay the Jet Plane is removed from the PBS Kids schedule.

June
 June 10: Paul Fierlinger's My Dog Tulip premiers.

August
 August 31: The first episode of Kabouter Wesley is broadcast.

July
 July 2: Andrei Khrzhanovsky's Room and a Half is released.
 July 21: Luke and Lucy: The Texas Rangers is released, the first CGI-animated feature film made in Belgium. It is also the first animated film based on the Belgian comics series Suske en Wiske, and the most expensive Flemish movie of the time.
 July 22: Totally Spies! The Movie premiers, the first film based on the eponymous TV series.

September
 September 3: 66th Venice International Film Festival: Tarik Saleh's Metropia premiers.
 September 7: The first episodes of Dinosaur Train and Wibbly Pig are broadcast.
 September 9: Shane Acker's 9 premiers.
 September 15: The first episode of Geronimo Stilton is broadcast. 
 September 17: The first episode of Archer is broadcast.
 September 22: 
 Phil Lord and Christopher Miller's Cloudy with a Chance of Meatballs is first released.
 Rob Zombie releases The Haunted World of El Superbeasto, based on his comic book of the same name.
 September 27: The first episode of The Cleveland Show airs, a spin-off of Family Guy revolving around Cleveland Brown.
 September 28: Nickelodeon rebrands with a new logo. Nicktoons Network shortens its name to Nicktoons. Noggin and The N are replaced by Nick Jr. and TeenNick (channels based on the Nick Jr. and TEENick blocks, respectively).
 September 29: The King of Milu Deer is released, the first Chinese CGI-animated film.

October
 October 2: The first episode of Kung Fu Dino Posse airs. 
 October 5: The first episode of Les Mistigris (Lulu's Islands) is broadcast.
 October 12: The first episode of Fanboy & Chum Chum is broadcast as a preview; it would later officially premiere on November 6.
 October 14: Wes Anderson's stop-motion film Fantastic Mr. Fox, based on Roald Dahl's eponymous children's book, premieres at the London Film Festival. 
 October 26: The first episode of Have a Laugh! airs.

November
 November 3: Robert Zemeckis' A Christmas Carol, starring Jim Carrey as Ebenezer Scrooge, premiers.
 November 8: The final episode of Ed, Edd n Eddy is broadcast.
 November 14: Jorge Blanco's Planet 51 premiers.
 Specific date unknown: The first episode of The Samsonadzes is broadcast.

December
 December 11: The Princess and the Frog is released, directed by Ron Clements and John Musker, the first Walt Disney Company production with an African-American lead character.
 December 30: Little Nemo, Quasi at the Quackadero, The Red Book and Scratch and Crow are added to the National Film Registry.

Specific date unknown
 Michael P. Heneghan's The Romantic is released.

Awards
 Academy Award for Best Animated Feature: Up
 Animation Kobe Feature Film Award: WALL-E
 Annecy International Animated Film Festival Cristal du long métrage: Coraline and Mary and Max
 Annie Award for Best Animated Feature: Up
 Asia Pacific Screen Award for Best Animated Feature Film: Mary and Max
 BAFTA Award for Best Animated Film: Up
 European Film Award for Best Animated Film: Mia and the Migoo
 Goya Award for Best Animated Film: Planet 51
 Japan Academy Prize for Animation of the Year: Summer Wars
 Japan Media Arts Festival Animation Grand Prize: Summer Wars
 Mainichi Film Awards - Animation Grand Award: Summer Wars

Films released

 January 9 - The Happy Cricket and the Giant Bugs (Brazil)
 January 16 - Pleasant Goat and Big Big Wolf: The Super Snail Adventure (China)
 January 25 - Afro Samurai: Resurrection (United States and Japan)
 January 27 - Hulk Vs (United States)
 February 6 - Coraline (United States)
 February 10 - VeggieTales: Abe and the Amazing Promise (United States)
 February 12:
 Alice's Birthday (Russia)
 Geng: The Adventure Begins (Malaysia)
 February 13:
 Agent Macaw: Shaken & Stirred (Mexico)
 Włatcy móch: Ćmoki, czopki i mondzioły (Poland)
 February 24 - Futurama: Into the Wild Green Yonder (United States)
 February 27 - The Velveteen Rabbit (United States)
 March 3:
 The Secret of Kells (Ireland, Belgium, and France)
 Wonder Woman (United States)
 March 5 - In the Attic or Who Has a Birthday Today? (Czech Republic)
 March 7 - Doraemon: The New Record of Nobita: Spaceblazer (Japan)
 March 12 - The Story of Mr. Sorry (South Korea)
 March 13 - Pettson & Findus IV – Forget-Abilities (Sweden)
 March 17 - Barbie Thumbelina (United States)
 March 20:
 Another Egg and Chicken Movie (Mexico)
 Pretty Cure All Stars DX: Everyone's Friends – the Collection of Miracles! (Japan)
 March 24 - Happily N'Ever After 2: Snow White—Another Bite @ the Apple (United States)
 March 25 - Animal Channel (Spain)
 March 26:
 Khan Kluay 2 (Thailand)
 Princess Lillifee (Germany)
 March 27 - Monsters vs. Aliens (United States)
 March 28 - Bye-Bye Bin Laden (United States)
 April 1 - The True History of Puss 'N Boots (France, Belgium, and Switzerland)
 April 7 - Scooby-Doo! and the Samurai Sword (United States)
 April 9:
 Mary and Max (Australia)
 Room and a Half (Russia)
 April 16 - Winnetoons, the Legend of Silver Lake (Germany and Belgium)
 April 18: 
 Detective Conan: The Raven Chaser (Japan)
 Last War of Heavenloids and Akutoloids (Japan)
 April 25:
 Eureka Seven: Good Night, Sleep Tight, Young Lovers (Japan)
 Gurren Lagann the Movie –The Lights in the Sky Are Stars- (Japan)
 April 28 - Baton (United States and Japan)
 May - Hidden Treasure of Wompkee Wood (United States)
 May 1 - Battle for Terra (United States)
 May 29 - Up (United States)
 June 10 - My Dog Tulip (United States)
 June 16 - Garfield's Pet Force (United States and South Korea)
 June 17:
 Lascars (France)
 A Town Called Panic (Belgium and Luxembourg)
 June 27 - Evangelion: 2.0 You Can (Not) Advance (Japan)
 July 1 - Ice Age: Dawn of the Dinosaurs (United States)
 July 7 - The Prodigy (United States)
 July 14 - Killer Bean Forever (United States)
 July 17 - Gladiformers 2 (Brazil)
 July 18 - Pokémon: Arceus and the Jewel of Life (United States and Japan)
 July 19 - Storm Rider Clash of the Evils (China)
 July 21 - Luke and Lucy: The Texas Rangers (Belgium, Luxembourg, and Netherlands)
 July 22 - Totally Spies! The Movie (France)
 July 23 - Friends Forever (Germany, France, and Italy)
 July 24 - McDull, Kung Fu Kindergarten (Hong Kong)
 July 28 - Green Lantern: First Flight (United States)
 August 1:
 Naruto Shippūden The Movie: Inheritors of the Will of Fire (Japan)
 Summer Wars (Japan)
 August 4 - VeggieTales: Minnesota Cuke and the Search for Noah's Umbrella (United States)
 August 13 - Jasper: Journey to the End of the World (Germany)
 August 14 - Redline (Japan)
 August 18 - LeapFrog: Let's Go to School (United States)
 August 22 - Oblivion Island: Haruka and the Magic Mirror (Japan)
 September 8 - Hero of the Rails (United Kingdom)
 September 9 - 9 (United States and Luxembourg)
 September 15:
 Barbie and the Three Musketeers (United States)
 Bionicle: The Legend Reborn (United States)
 September 18 - Cloudy with a Chance of Meatballs (United States)
 September 20 - Olives Dream (Turkey)
 September 22 - The Haunted World of El Superbeasto (United States)
 September 24 - Laura's Star and the Mysterious Dragon Nian (Germany)
 September 26 - Eden of The East Compilation: Air Communication (Japan)
 September 28 - Technotise: Edit & I (Serbia)
 September 29:
 The King of Milu Deer (China)
  Superman/Batman: Public Enemies (United States)
 October - King of Thorn (Japan)
 October 3 - Tales of Vesperia: The First Strike (Japan)
 October 6 - VeggieTales: Saint Nicholas: A Story of Joyful Giving (United States)
 October 8:
 Astro Boy (United States and Hong Kong)
 The Dolphin: Story of a Dreamer (Peru)
 October 9 - Copernicus' Star (Poland)
 October 12 - Port of Return (Taiwan)
 October 13 - Twinkle Wish Adventure (United States)
 October 15 - First Squad (Japan and Russia)
 October 22 - Boogie (Argentina)
 October 27 - Tinker Bell and the Lost Treasure (United States)
 October 30 - The Apple & the Worm (Denmark and Sweden)
 October 31 - Fresh Pretty Cure the Movie: The Kingdom of Toys has Lots of Secrets!? (Japan)
 November 6 - A Christmas Carol (United States)
 November 8 - Ed, Edd n Eddy's Big Picture Show (United States)
 November 13: 
 Fantastic Mr. Fox (United States)
 The Watercolor (Turkey)
 November 14 - The Sun (Argentina)
 November 20 - Planet 51 (United States, United Kingdom, and Spain)
 November 21: 
 Macross Frontier The Movie: The False Songstress (Japan)
 Mai Mai Miracle (Japan)
 November 27 - Metropia (Sweden, Denmark, and Norway)
 November 28 - Eden of the East the Movie I: The King of Eden (Japan)
 December 2 - Arthur and the Revenge of Maltazard (France)
 December 10 - Masha and the Magic Nut (Russia)
 December 11 - The Princess and the Frog (United States)
 December 12:
 One Piece Film: Strong World (Japan)
 Space Battleship Yamato: Resurrection (Japan)
 December 16 - Eleanor's Secret (France)
 December 19 - Professor Layton and the Eternal Diva (Japan)
 December 23 - Yona Yona Penguin (Japan and France)
 December 25 - Pelle Politibil går i vannet (Norway)
 Specific date unknown: 
 Little Bee (Brazil)
 Pocoyo And The Space Circus (Spain)
 The Romantic (United States)
 What's Up?: Balloon to the rescue (Brazil)

Television series debuts

Television series endings

Births

February
 February 22: Archie Yates, English child actor (voice of Sprout in Wolfboy and the Everything Factory, Kappa in Oni: Thunder God's Tale, Jojo Potato in the Amphibia episode "Newts in Tights").

March
 March 13: Iara Nemirovsky, American actress (voice of the title character in Ridley Jones, Ellie in Ron's Gone Wrong).

May 
 May 11: Trinity Bliss, American actress (voice of Rita Raspberry in Princess Power).

June 
 June 4: Antonio Raul Corbo, American child actor (voice of young SpongeBob SquarePants in The SpongeBob Movie: Sponge on the Run, continued voice of Oscar Peltzer in Summer Camp Island).
 June 24: Jaden Oehr, Canadian child actor (voice of Henry in Team Zenko Go).

July
 July 18: Jahzir Bruno, American child actor (voice of Clyde McBride in season 6 of The Loud House and The Casagrandes episode "Phantom Freakout").

October
 October 28: Libby Rue, American child actress (voice of Alice in Alice's Wonderland Bakery).

November
 November 22: Bentley Griffin, American child actor (voice of Lincoln Loud in season 6 of The Loud House and The Casagrandes episodes "Skatey Cat" and "Phantom Freakout", Tomo/Angel in Belle).

Deaths

January
 January 13: Patrick McGoohan, Irish-American actor, director, screenwriter and producer (voice of Billy Bones in Treasure Planet, Number Six in The Simpsons episode "The Computer Wore Menace Shoes"), dies at age 80.
 January 14: Ricardo Montalbán, Mexican actor (voice of Armando Guitierrez in Freakazoid!, Señor Senior Sr. in Kim Possible, the Head of Council in The Ant Bully, Gone Juan in The Spooktacular New Adventures of Casper, Vartkes in the Buzz Lightyear of Star Command episode "Lone Wolf", El Encantador in the Dora the Explorer episode "The Missing Piece", the Cow in the Family Guy episode "McStroke", General Juanito Pequeño in the American Dad! episode "Moon Over Isla Island"), dies at age 88.
 January 23: Hisayuki Toriumi, Japanese animator (Tatsunoko Production, Sunrise, Studio Pierrot), and film director and producer (Science Ninja Team Gatchaman), screenwriter and novelist, dies at age 67.
 January 27: John Updike, American novelist, poet, short-story writer, art critic and literary critic (voiced himself in The Simpsons episode "Insane Clown Poppy"), dies from lung cancer at age 76.

February
 February 4: Lux Interior, American singer (voice of Bird Brains Lead Singer in SpongeBob SquarePants, Rayo X, Tarzan Eightball and Goth Boy in Los Campeones de la Lucha Libre), dies from aortic dissection at age 62.
 February 5: Albert Barillé, Polish-French animator, screenwriter and film producer (Procidis, Once Upon a Time...), dies at age 88.
 February 7: Blossom Dearie, American jazz singer and pianist (Schoolhouse Rock!), dies at age 84.
 February 13: Johnny Hawksworth, English musician and composer (wrote the theme song for Roobarb), dies at age 85.

March
 March 10: Jack Grimes, American actor (voice of Jimmy Olsen in The New Adventures of Superman, Sparky and Chim-Chim in Speed Racer), dies at age 82.
 March 14: Millard Kaufman, American screenwriter (co-creator of Mr. Magoo), dies at age 92.
 March 16: Jack Lawrence, American songwriter (Peter Pan, Sleeping Beauty), dies at age 96.

April
 April 25: Bea Arthur, American actress and comedian (voice of Femputer in the Futurama episode "Amazon Women in the Mood"), dies from lung cancer at age 86.

May
 May 4: Dom DeLuise, American actor (voice of Jeremy in The Secret of NIMH, Tiger in An American Tail, Fagin in Oliver & Company, Itchy Itchiford in All Dogs Go to Heaven, Stanley in A Troll in Central Park, Koosalagoopagoop in Dexter's Laboratory), dies at age 75.
 May 6: Vincent Davis, Australian-American animator (Fred Wolf Films, Gallavants, The Wuzzles), storyboard artist (DIC Entertainment), character designer (The Mouse and His Child), lip sync artist (Camp Candy), sheet timer (Fluppy Dogs, DuckTales, DIC Entertainment, The Mask, Life with Louie, Warner Bros. Animation, Holly Hobbie & Friends), art director (The Real Ghostbusters), production designer (The Mouse and His Child), writer (Cow and Chicken, Grim & Evil), director (Fred Wolf Films, The Little Clowns of Happytown, DuckTales, Captain Planet and the Planeteers, Film Roman) and producer (Garfield and Friends, Cow and Chicken, I Am Weasel, Grim & Evil), dies at age 65.
 May 7: Linda Dangcil, American actress (voice of Carmen Alonso / Raya in Jem, Homeless Woman in the Static Shock episode "Frozen Out", additional voices in A Pup Named Scooby-Doo), dies from throat cancer at age 67.
 May 19: Wayne Allwine, American actor (voice of Mickey Mouse from 1977-2009), dies at age 62.
 May 21: Joan Alexander, American actress (voice of Lois Lane in Superman), dies at age 94.

June 
 June 3:
 David Carradine, American actor (voice of Mandrax in Captain Simian & the Space Monkeys, Chief Wulisso in An American Tail: The Treasure of Manhattan Island, Nava in Balto II: Wolf Quest, Mr. Snerz in Hair High, Clockwork in Danny Phantom, Lo Pei in the Jackie Chan Adventures episode "The Warrior Incarnate", Junichiro Hill in the King of the Hill episode "Returning Japanese"), dies from erotic asphyxiation at age 72.
 Koko Taylor, American singer (voiced herself in the Arthur episode "Big Horns George"), dies from gastrointestinal bleeding at age 80.
 June 9: Dave Simons, American comic book artist, animator and storyboard artist (Marvel Productions, Spiral Zone, Teenage Mutant Ninja Turtles, DIC Entertainment, Conan the Adventurer, Captain Planet and the Planeteers, Universal Cartoon Studios, Gargoyles, X-Men, Street Fighter: the Animated Series, Extreme Ghostbusters, Men in Black: The Series, Courage the Cowardly Dog, Butt-Ugly Martians, The Zula Patrol, Maya & Miguel, Kappa Mikey), dies at age 54.
 June 20: Jaime Diaz, Argentine-born American animator (Warner Bros. Cartoons, Hanna-Barbera, Ruby-Spears Enterprises), director (Duckman, The Fairly OddParents, ChalkZone) and sheet timer (Klasky-Csupo, Jumanji, Dora the Explorer, Danger Rangers, American Dad!, Curious George), dies at age 72.
 June 23: Ed McMahon, American announcer, game show host, comedian, actor, singer and combat aviator (voice of Engineer's Henchman in the Bruno the Kid episode "Bullet Train", Governor #1, Eugene Oregon and Beaver #5 in the I Am Weasel episode "I Am Ambassador", Announcer in The Angry Beavers episode "I Dare You", Tug Boat Captain Hero in the Higglytown Heroes episode "Ship Ahoy!", himself in the Pinky and the Brain episode "The Pinky and the Brain Reunion Special", The Simpsons episode "Treehouse of Horror IX", the Family Guy episode "When You Wish Upon a Weinstein", and the Duck Dodgers episode "Back to the Academy"), dies at age 86.
 June 25:
 Michael Jackson, American singer, songwriter and dancer (voice of Leon Kompowsky in The Simpsons episode "Stark Raving Dad"), dies from cardiac arrest at age 50.
 Farrah Fawcett, American actress (voice of Faucet in The Brave Little Toaster Goes to Mars, herself in the Johnny Bravo episode "Johnny Meets Farrah Fawcett"), dies from anal cancer at age 62.

July
 July 6: Alfons Figueras, Spanish animator and comics artist (MGM animation, RKO Radio Network, Hispano Graphic Films), dies at age 86.
 July 14: Dallas McKennon, American voice actor (voice of Inspector Willoughby and Buzz Buzzard in Woody Woodpecker, Gumby and other characters in Gumby, The Professor at the Zoo, Toughy the Bulldog, Pedro the Chihuahua and The Hyena in Lady and the Tramp, Diablo and Vernon in Sleeping Beauty, The Fox and one of the Penguins in Mary Poppins, Max in How the Grinch Stole Christmas, Archie Andrews, Hot Dog and Mr. Weatherbee in The Archie Show), dies at age 89.
 July 17: Walter Cronkite, American broadcast journalist (voice of Captain Neweyes in We're Back! A Dinosaur's Story, Benjamin Franklin in Liberty's Kids), dies from cerebrovascular disease at age 92.
 July 21: 
 Heinz Edelmann, German graphic designer, illustrator, animator, cartoonist and comics artist (Yellow Submarine), dies from heart disease at age 75.
 Yoshinori Kanada, Japanese animator (Birth, worked for Hayao Miyazaki), dies from a heart attack at age 57.
 July 22: John Ryan, English comics artist and animator (Captain Pugwash), dies at age 88.

August
 August 15: Virginia Davis, American actress (portrayed Alice in Alice Comedies), dies at age 90.
 August 25: Ted Kennedy, American lawyer and politician (guest starred in the Fetch! with Ruff Ruffman episode "Mr. Ruffman Goes to Washington"), dies from brain cancer at age 77.

September
 September 11: Yoshito Usui, Japanese manga artist (creator of Crayon Shin-chan), dies from a mountain climbing accident at age 51.
 September 14:
 Henry Gibson, American actor (voice of Wilbur in Charlotte's Web, Eleroo in The Wuzzles, Dr. Applecheek in Tom and Jerry: The Movie, Lord Pain in The Grim Adventures of Billy & Mandy), dies at age 73.
 Patrick Swayze, American actor, dancer, choreographer, singer, songwriter and film producer (voice of Cash in The Fox and the Hound 2), dies from pancreatic cancer at age 57.
 September 24: Robert Sahakyants, Armenian animator and film director (The Lesson), dies at age 59.

October
 October 14: Lou Albano, Italian-American wrestler and actor (voice of Mario in The Super Mario Bros. Super Show!), dies from a heart attack at age 76.
 October 20:
 Attila Dargay, Hungarian animator, film director and comics artist (Mattie the Goose-boy, Vuk, Szaffi), dies at age 82.
 Sultan Pepper, American television writer (CatDog, The Angry Beavers, Crashbox), dies at age 47.
 October 22: Soupy Sales, American comedian, actor, radio/television personality and jazz aficionado (voice of the title character in the Donkey Kong segment of Saturday Supercade), dies from cancer at age 83.

November
 November 4: Carl Ballantine, American magician, comedian, and actor (voice of Al G. Swindler in Garfield and Friends, Lenny Luntz in Spider-Man, Huska in Freakazoid!) dies at age 92.

December
 December 16: Roy E. Disney, American businessman (The Walt Disney Company, voiced himself in the Mickey Mouse Works episode "Mickey's Mix Up"), dies from stomach cancer at age 79.
December 20:
 Arnold Stang, American actor (voice of the title character in Top Cat) dies at age 91.
 Brittany Murphy, American actress and singer (voice of Luanne Platter in King of the Hill, Tank in Pepper Ann, Gloria in Happy Feet, and Colleen O'Hallahan in the Futurama episode "The Beast with a Billion Backs"), dies at age 32.
December 30: Dana Landsberg, American animator, writer and designer (Disney Television Animation), dies at age 45.

See also
2009 in anime

References

External links 
Animated works of the year, listed in the IMDb

 
2000s in animation